On May 7, 1912 Herman McInnes resigned from Edmonton City Council.  One week later, on May 14, Charles Gowan did the same.  On June 7, a by-election was held to replace both aldermen.  The first place candidate would replace Gowan, who had been elected to a two-year term in February, while the second place candidate would replace McInnis, who had been elected to a one-year term.  In addition, eight bylaws were put to the electorate on the same ballot.

Results

Bold indicates elected.

Aldermanic Race

Alexander Livingstone - 700
James Macfie MacDonald - 585
J E Theriault - 577
D B Campbell - 259
E H Cotterell - 208
 J J Denman - 181

Bylaws

Bylaw 371
To provide by issue of debentures $210,240.00 for improving and further extending Municipal Power House and Plant.
For: 877
Against: 105

Bylaw 376
To provide by issue of debentures $200,020.00 to pay City share of paving certain streets.
For: 376
Against: 45

Bylaw 427
To provide for the raising by the issue of debentures the sum of $50,126.67 for the purchasing of a site whereon to erect car barns in connection with the municipal street railway of the City of Edmonton.
For: 920
Against: 107

Bylaw 428
To raise by the issue of debentures the sum on $25,100.00 for the purchase of bridging two certain ravines of Forty-second Street or Carleton Street
For: 701
Against: 330

Bylaw 429
To authorize the establishment of a gas plant for the manufacture, distribution and supply of gas and to provide by the issue of debentures of the sum of $770,880.00 for such purposes.
For: 197
Against: 836

Bylaw 430
To provide by the issue of debentures the sum of $21,900.00 for the purchase of a telephone sub-station.
For: 850
Against: 119

Bylaw 431
To provide for the raising by the issue of debentures the sum of $150,380.00 for acquiring certain lands to extend the Park and Driveway System of the City of Edmonton.
For: 774
Against: 241

Bylaw 435
To provide by the issue of debentures the sum of $66,000.00 to purchase certain lands for warehouse and storage yards south of the Saskatchewan River.
For: 772
Against: 212

References
City of Edmonton: Edmonton Elections

1912-05
1912 elections in Canada
1912 in Alberta